Codman may refer to:

Buildings 
Codman Building, historic building at 55 Kilby Street, Boston, Massachusetts
Codman House, historic house set on a  estate at 36 Codman Road, Lincoln, Massachusetts
Codman–Davis House, four-story, red brick, 1906, classical revival house in Washington, D.C.
Codman Carriage House and Stable, historic former carriage house and stable in Washington, D.C.
Col. Charles Codman Estate, historic house at 43 Ocean View Avenue in Barnstable, Massachusetts

People 
Charles Codman Cabot (1900–1976), American jurist
Charles Codman (1800–1842), landscape painter of Portland, Maine
Charles R. Codman (Civil War) (1828–1918), American military commander during the Civil War.
Charles R. Codman (1893–1956), American author, wine expert, and aide to General George S. Patton during World War II
Ernest Amory Codman (1869–1940), Boston surgeon who pioneered outcome-based health care
Henry Codman Potter (1835–1908), bishop of the Episcopal Church of the United States
Henry Sargent Codman (1863–1893), American landscape architect in Frederick Law Olmsted's design firm
John Amory Codman (1824–1886), artist in Boston, Massachusetts
John Codman Ropes (1836–1899), American military historian and lawyer born at St. Petersburg
Julian Codman (1870–1932), lawyer involved with Anti-Imperialist League
Ogden Codman (1863–1951), American architect, interior decorator and co-author of The Decoration of Houses (1897)
Robert Codman (1859–1915), bishop of the Episcopal Diocese of Maine
Stephen Codman (1796–1852), Canadian composer

Other 
Codman Square District, historic district in Boston, Massachusetts
Codman's triangle, area of new subperiosteal bone that is created when a lesion raises the periosteum away from the bone